Ferenc Chorin (Arad 11 May 1842 – Budapest, 20 January 1925) was a Hungarian politician and a member of the National Assembly of Hungary.

He was born in Arad, Kingdom of Hungary, Austrian Empire (today in Romania) and descended from a rabbi. He was among the first Jews elected to the Hungarian parliament (1867). He converted to Christianity and was made a life member of the parliament's upper house, the House of Magnates (1903). Apart from politics, he was a mining company executive. He died in Budapest and is buried in the Kerepesi cemetery.

References

People from Arad, Romania
Politicians from Budapest
Jewish Hungarian politicians
Converts to Christianity from Judaism
1842 births
1925 deaths
Hungarian industrialists
Members of the House of Representatives (Hungary)
Members of the House of Magnates
Burials at Kerepesi Cemetery
Left Centre politicians